The 1919 Liverpool West Derby by-election was a parliamentary by-election held on 26 February 1919 for the British House of Commons constituency of Liverpool West Derby, in the County Palatine of Lancashire.

Vacancy
The seat had become vacant on the elevation to the peerage of the constituency's Unionist Member of Parliament (MP), F. E. Smith, as Baron Birkenhead. He had been raised to the peerage to take up the post of Lord Chancellor.

Electoral history
Smith had held the seat since the 1918 general election, when he was endorsed by the Coalition Government. Before that he held its predecessor seat, Liverpool Walton since the 1906 general election.

Candidates 
The Unionist Party selected as its candidate Rear-Admiral Sir William Reginald Hall. Hall was endorsed by the Coalition Government.
George Nelson stood for the Labour Party. He had stood against Smith at the recent General Election.

Results 
Turnout was unsurprisingly low so soon after a General Election. Hall won the seat by a much reduced margin.

See also
 List of United Kingdom by-elections
 Liverpool West Derby constituency

References

 
 
 The Times, 12 March 1919

Liverpool West Derby by-election
Liverpool West Derby by-election
West Derby, 1919
1910s in Liverpool
Liverpool West Derby by-election